Cono Island is a conspicuous conical island lying south of the Chatos Islands, off the southwest part of Adelaide Island. The feature was descriptively named Islote Cono (cone islet) by the Argentine Antarctic Expedition of 1952–53.

See also 
 List of Antarctic and sub-Antarctic islands

References
 

Islands of Adelaide Island